Thomas Ellis Kirby (1846–1924) was an auctioneer at American Art Galleries. He was known as the "grand old man of the auction room".

Biography
He was born in 1846. He married and had a son, Gustavus T. Kirby.

He was one of the three founders of the American Art Association (AAA) in 1883 in New York.

He died in 1924.

References

1846 births
1924 deaths
American auctioneers